Marjorie Taylor (1912–1974) was a British stage and film actress. She played the female lead in several Tod Slaughter films during the 1930s.

Filmography
 The Heirloom Mystery (1936)
 The Crimes of Stephen Hawke (1936)
 Well Done, Henry (1936)
 Reasonable Doubt (1936)
 Nothing Like Publicity (1936)
 Racing Romance (1937)
 It's Never Too Late to Mend (1937)
 The Ticket of Leave Man (1937)
 The Elder Brother (1937)
 Silver Top (1938)
 Paid in Error (1938)
 Easy Riches (1938)
 Miracles Do Happen (1939)
 The Face at the Window (1939)
 Three Silent Men (1940)

References

Bibliography
 Goble, Alan. The Complete Index to Literary Sources in Film. Walter de Gruyter, 1999.

External links

1912 births
1974 deaths
British stage actresses
British film actresses
People from Blackburn